Professor Hong is the John R. Eckel Jr. Professor of Financial Economics at Columbia University. He was awarded the 2009 Fischer Black Prize by the American Finance Association, given biennially to a financial economics scholar under the age of 40 for significant original research that is relevant to finance practice.

He received his B.A. in economics and statistics with highest distinction from the University of California, Berkeley in 1992 and his Ph.D. in economics from the Massachusetts Institute of Technology in 1997. He was earlier the John Scully ’66 Professor of Economics and Finance at Princeton University. His research interests include behavioural finance and stock market efficiency, asset pricing and trading under market imperfections, incentives and biases in decision making, and organisational form and performance.

References

Year of birth missing (living people)
Living people
American economists
Columbia University faculty
Princeton University faculty
Massachusetts Institute of Technology alumni
Stanford University Graduate School of Business faculty
University of California, Berkeley alumni